Volborthite is a mineral containing copper and vanadium, with the formula Cu3V2O7(OH)2·2H2O. Found originally in 1838 in the Urals, it was first named knaufite but was later changed to volborthite for Alexander von Volborth (1800–1876), a Russian paleontologist.

Tangeite (synonym: calciovolborthite), CaCuVO4(OH), is closely related.

Occurrence
Volborthite was first described in 1837 for an occurrence in the Sofronovskii Mine, Yugovskii Zavod, Perm, Permskaya Oblast, Middle Urals, Russia.

It occurs as an uncommon oxidation mineral in vanadium bearing hydrothermal copper ores. It is associated with brochantite, malachite, atacamite, tangeite, chrysocolla, baryte and gypsum.

References

Copper(II) minerals
Vanadate minerals
Phosphate minerals
Monoclinic minerals
Minerals in space group 12